The discography of Irish boy band Boyzone contains seven studio albums, nine compilation albums, one singles box set, thirty singles and ten video albums.

Boyzone released their debut single, a cover version of the Four Seasons' hit "Working My Way Back to You", in 1994 and it reached number three on the Irish Singles Chart. The release of their second single and cover version of the classic Osmonds' hit, "Love Me for a Reason", was their debut elsewhere. It peaked at number two on the UK Singles Chart and was included on their 1995 debut album Said and Done. The album reached number one in Ireland and the UK. Boyzone's second album, A Different Beat, was released in 1996 and contained the band's first UK number one single, a cover of the Bee Gees' hit "Words". The album also contained the singles "A Different Beat" and "Isn't It a Wonder". Their third album, Where We Belong, was released in 1998 and it contained the singles "All That I Need", "Baby Can I Hold You" and "No Matter What". In 1999, Boyzone released a greatest hits compilation, By Request. The band then went on hiatus whilst all the members pursued solo projects.

In September 2008, the band returned with "Love You Anyway", which peaked at number five in the UK, making it their seventeenth consecutive top five single. Their second single of 2008, "Better", peaked at number 22 in the UK. In 2010, "Gave It All Away", the lead single from their fourth studio album Brother, peaked at number 9 in the UK and number 1 in Ireland; "Love Is a Hurricane" was also released as a single from the album, but was less successful. In 2013, to celebrate 20 years of the band, their fifth studio album BZ20 was released, along with the single "Love Will Save the Day". In 2018, Boyzone released their seventh studio album Thank You & Goodnight, which spawned four singles.

Albums

Studio albums

Compilation albums

Singles

 Only released in the United States.

Video albums

Music videos

References

External links
Tour website

Discography
Discographies of Irish artists
Pop music group discographies